Inverse or invert may refer to:

Science and mathematics
 Inverse (logic), a type of conditional sentence which is an immediate inference made from another conditional sentence
 Additive inverse (negation), the inverse of a number that, when added to the original number, yields zero
 Compositional inverse, a function that "reverses" another function
 Inverse element
 Inverse function, a function that "reverses" another function
Generalized inverse, a matrix that has some properties of the inverse matrix but not necessarily all of them
 Multiplicative inverse (reciprocal), a number which when multiplied by a given number yields the multiplicative identity, 1
 Inverse matrix of an Invertible matrix

Other uses
  Invert level, the base interior level of a pipe, trench or tunnel
 Inverse (website), an online magazine
 An outdated term for an LGBT person; see Sexual inversion (sexology)

See also
 Inversion (disambiguation)
 Inverter (disambiguation)
 Opposite (disambiguation)
 Reverse (disambiguation)
 Complement (disambiguation)